The Boston mayoral election of 1863 saw Frederic W. Lincoln Jr. reelected to a fifth overall term.

Results

See also
List of mayors of Boston, Massachusetts

References

Mayoral elections in Boston
Boston
Boston mayoral
19th century in Boston